The Producers Guild Film Award for Best Film (previously known as the Apsara Award for Best Film) is given by the producers of the film and television guild as part of its annual award ceremony to recognise the best film of the year. Following its inception in 2004, no one was awarded in 2005 and 2007.

Winners

See also
Producers Guild Film Awards
Producers Guild Film Award for Best Director
Producers Guild Film Award for Best Actor in a Leading Role
Producers Guild Film Award for Best Actress in a Leading Role

References

Producers Guild Film Awards